The Pensacola Classic was a golf tournament on the Nike Tour. It was played from 1990 to 1995, except in 1993. In 1995 the winner earned $36,000.

Tournament hosts
1994-95 The Moors Golf Course, Milton, Florida
1991-92 Marcus Pointe Golf Course, Pensacola, Florida
1990 Pensacola Country Club, Pensacola, Florida

Winners

Notes

Former Korn Ferry Tour events
Golf in Florida
Sports in Pensacola, Florida
Recurring sporting events established in 1990
Recurring sporting events disestablished in 1995
1990 establishments in Florida
1995 disestablishments in Florida